Jie Chen or Chen Jie (depending on Chinese name ordering) may refer to the following people:

Chen Jie (actress) on The Young Warriors (TV series)
Chen Jie (ambassador), Chinese ambassador to Germany before World War II
Chen Jie (footballer) (born 1989)
Chen Jie (swimmer), on the 2016 Chinese Olympic team
Jie Chen (pianist) (born 1985)
Jie Chen (news anchor), on KTSF
Jie Chen (statistician)
Chen Jie, a fictional prison guard in Seventeen Years (film)